The 1990–91 NBA season was the 23rd season for the Seattle SuperSonics in the National Basketball Association. Head coach Bernie Bickerstaff was replaced by his former assistant K. C. Jones, and went on to occupy the desk of vice-president of Basketball Operations for Seattle, resigning months later to accept a job as General Manager of the Denver Nuggets.
The Draft Lottery gave the SuperSonics the No. 2 pick, which was used to select future All-Star point guard Gary Payton out of Oregon State in the 1990 NBA draft.

Substantial changes were made on the roster, first by trading Sonics referent Xavier McDaniel to the Phoenix Suns in exchange for Eddie Johnson during the first months of competition. Following the All-Star break, the team traded Dale Ellis, whose off-the-court problems were the focus of much unwanted attention, to the Milwaukee Bucks in exchange for Ricky Pierce, and sent center Olden Polynice to the Los Angeles Clippers in exchange for Benoit Benjamin. The Sonics held a 22–23 record at the All-Star break, and would finish with a 41–41 record like the previous season, this time being able to reach the playoffs as the #8 seed in the Western Conference, where they lost in the Western Conference First Round to the top-seeded Portland Trail Blazers in 5 games.

Johnson averaged 17.4 points per game with the team after the trade, while Derrick McKey averaged 15.3 points and 5.8 rebounds per game, and second-year forward Shawn Kemp showed improvement, averaging 15.0 points, 8.4 rebounds and 1.5 blocks per game. In addition, Sedale Threatt contributed 12.7 points and 1.4 steals per game, while Payton provided with 7.2 points, 6.4 assists and 2.0 steals per game, and was named to the NBA All-Rookie Second Team, and Michael Cage averaged 6.4 points and 6.8 rebounds per game. Following the season, Threatt was traded to the Los Angeles Lakers.

Offseason

Draft picks

Of the 3 players Seattle picked in the draft only Gary Payton would stay with the team, since Jud Buechler was traded to the New Jersey Nets and Abdul Shamsid-Deen went to Europe to play for the French team Paris Basket Racing.

Pre-season

Roster

Regular season

Season standings

y – clinched division title
x – clinched playoff spot

z – clinched division title
y – clinched division title
x – clinched playoff spot

Record vs. opponents

Game log

|- bgcolor="#ccffcc"
| 1
| November 3
| Houston Rockets
| W 118-106
| X. McDaniel (24)
| S. Kemp (10)
| X. McDaniel,S. Threatt (7)
| Seattle Center Coliseum13,922
| 1–0
|- bgcolor="#ccffcc"
| 2
| November 6
| Detroit Pistons
| W 100-92
| X. McDaniel (24)
| S. Kemp (13)
| G. Payton (6)
| Seattle Center Coliseum13,078
| 2–0
|- bgcolor="#ccffcc"
| 3
| November 9
| @ Denver Nuggets
| W 135-129
| X. McDaniel (27)
| D. McKey (14)
| G. Payton (10)
| McNichols Sports Arena10,571
| 3–0
|- bgcolor="#ffcccc"
| 4
| November 10
| Golden State Warriors
| L 100-117
| X. McDaniel (26)
| X. McDaniel,D. McKey (9)
| G. Payton (9)
| Tacoma Dome13,130
| 3–1
|- bgcolor="#ffcccc"
| 5
| November 13
| New York Knicks
| L 100-116 (OT)
| S. Threatt (24)
| X. McDaniel (10)
| G. Payton (7)
| Seattle Center Coliseum12,352
| 3–2
|- bgcolor="#ffcccc"
| 6
| November 17
| Chicago Bulls
| L 95-116
| X. McDaniel (17)
| M. Cage (7)
| G. Payton (5)
| Seattle Center Coliseum14,692
| 3–3
|- bgcolor="#ffcccc"
| 7
| November 18
| @ Los Angeles Clippers
| L 65-78
| S. Kemp (11)
| M. Cage (10)
| G. Payton (5)
| Los Angeles Memorial Sports Arena10,980
| 3–4
|- bgcolor="#ccffcc"
| 8
| November 20
| New Jersey Nets
| W 105-88
| X. McDaniel (35)
| S. Kemp (8)
| G. Payton (9)
| Seattle Center Coliseum10,466
| 4–4
|- bgcolor="#ffcccc"
| 9
| November 23
| @ Utah Jazz
| L 96-97
| X. McDaniel (33)
| D. McKey (11)
| S. Threatt (12)
| Salt Palace12,616
| 4–5
|- bgcolor="#ffcccc"
| 10
| November 27
| San Antonio Spurs
| L 111-124
| Q. Dailey (29)
| M. Cage (8)
| G. Payton (8)
| Seattle Center Coliseum13,293
| 4–6
|- bgcolor="#ffcccc"
| 11
| November 29
| @ Phoenix
| L 110-128
| D. McKey (26)
| S. Kemp (11)
| G. Payton (6)
| Arizona Veterans Memorial Coliseum14,487
| 4–7

|- bgcolor="#ffcccc"
| 12
| December 1
| Portland Trail Blazers
| L 124-130 (3 OT)
| X. McDaniel (41)
| M. Cage (15)
| G. Payton (8)
| Seattle Center Coliseum14,674
| 4–8
|- bgcolor="#ffcccc"
| 13
| December 3
| @ Boston Celtics
| L 102-135
| S. Threatt (20)
| O. Polynice (9)
| D. Barros (6)
| Boston Garden14,890
| 4–9

|- bgcolor="#ffcccc"
| 14
| December 4
| @ New Jersey Nets
| L 102-106
| S. Threatt (20)
| M. Cage (14)
| G. Payton (9)
| Brendan Byrne Arena7,029
| 4–10

|- bgcolor="#ccffcc"
| 15
| December 6
| @ Miami Heat
| W 105-103
| S. Threatt (18)
| S. Kemp (8)
| S. Threatt (11)
| Miami Arena15,008
| 5–10

|- bgcolor="#ffcccc"
| 16
| December 7
| @ Orlando Magic
| L 100-106
| D. McKey (24)
| M. Cage (9)
| G. Payton (7)
| Orlando Arena15,077
| 5–11

|- bgcolor="#ffcccc"
| 17
| December 9
| @ Milwaukee Bucks
| L 99-105
| S. Kemp (31)
| S. Kemp,D. McKey (10)
| N. McMillan,G. Payton (6)
| Bradley Center14,327
| 5–12

|- bgcolor="#ccffcc"
| 18
| December 12
| Indiana Pacers
| W 99-90
| S. Kemp,D. McKey (18)
| S. Kemp (11)
| N. McMillan (9)
| Seattle Center Coliseum10,729
| 6–12

|- bgcolor="#ffcccc"
| 19
| December 13
| @ Golden State Warriors
| L 106-129
| D. Barros (24)
| O. Polynice (7)
| D. Barros,D. Ellis (4)
| Oakland–Alameda County Coliseum Arena15,025
| 6–13

|- bgcolor="#ccffcc"
| 20
| December 15
| Dallas Mavericks
| W 106-105
| S. Kemp (22)
| M. Cage (8)
| N. McMillan (10)
| Seattle Center Coliseum10,009
| 7–13

|- bgcolor="#ccffcc"
| 21
| December 18
| Orlando Magic
| W 122-105
| D. McKey (33)
| S. Kemp (11)
| N. McMillan (14)
| Seattle Center Coliseum1,568
| 8–13

|- bgcolor="#ccffcc"
| 22
| December 20
| @ Sacramento Kings
| W 110-75
| D. Ellis (22)
| S. Kemp (10)
| G. Payton (12)
| ARCO Arena17,014
| 9–13

|- bgcolor="#ccffcc"
| 23
| December 22
| Sacramento Kings
| W 121-93
| E. Johnson (25)
| O. Polynice (11)
| N. McMillan (9)
| Seattle Center Coliseum10,315
| 10–13

|- bgcolor="#ccffcc"
| 24
| December 26
| @ Cleveland Cavaliers
| W 99-97
| S. Kemp (19)
| M. Cage (8)
| G. Payton (7)
| Coliseum at Richfield14,839
| 11–13

|- bgcolor="#ccffcc"
| 25
| December 27
| @ Washington Bullets
| W 125-120
| E. Johnson (22)
| S. Kemp (12)
| G. Payton (11)
| Capital Centre2,413
| 12–13

|- bgcolor="#ffcccc"
| 26
| December 29
| @ Chicago Bulls
| L 91-116
| D. McKey (22)
| S. Kemp (7)
| G. Payton (6)
| Chicago Stadium18,676
| 12–14

|- bgcolor="#ffcccc"
| 27
| December 30
| @ Minnesota Timberwolves
| L 106-126
| D. Ellis (25)
| S. Kemp (11)
| G. Payton (6)
| Target Center19,006
| 12–15

|- bgcolor="#ccffcc"
| 28
| January 3
| Philadelphia 76ers
| W 127-99
| D. McKey (24)
| M. Cage (12)
| G. Payton (11)
| Seattle Center Coliseum13,048
| 13-15

|- bgcolor="#ccffcc"
| 29
| January 4
| Miami Heat
| W 112-86
| S. Threatt (30)
| M. Cage (13)
| G. Payton (12)
| Seattle Center Coliseum12,074
| 14-15

|- bgcolor="#ffcccc"
| 30
| January 6
| @ Portland Trail Blazers
| L 111-114
| S. Kemp (25)
| S. Kemp (9)
| G. Payton (7)
| Memorial Coliseum 12,884
| 14-16

|- bgcolor="#ccffcc"
| 31
| January 8
| Los Angeles Lakers
| W 96-88
| D. McKey (29)
| O. Polynice (11)
| N. McMillan (10)
| Seattle Center Coliseum14,441
| 15-16

|- bgcolor="#ffcccc"
| 32
| January 10
| Golden State Warriors
| L 103-113
| D. McKey (19)
| S. Kemp,O. Polynice (12)
| N. McMillan (7)
| Seattle Center Coliseum10,813
| 15-17

|- bgcolor="#ffcccc"
| 33
| January 12
| @ Sacramento Kings
| L 85-101
| D. McKey (20)
| O. Polynice (14)
| G. Payton (9)
| ARCO Arena17,014
| 15-18

|- bgcolor="#ccffcc"
| 34
| January 15
| Denver Nuggets
| W 146-99
| D. Barros,D. Ellis (22)
| S. Kemp (12)
| N. McMillan (9)
| Seattle Center Coliseum9,618
| 16-18

|- bgcolor="#ffcccc"
| 35
| January 18
| @ Los Angeles Lakers
| L 96-105
| D. McKey (24)
| S. Kemp (8)
| G. Payton (11)
| Great Western Forum17,505
| 16-19

|- bgcolor="#ccffcc"
| 36
| January 19
| Washington Bullets
| W 111-89
| O. Polynice (27)
| S. Kemp (13)
| N. McMillan (8)
| Seattle Center Coliseum13,369
| 17-19

|- bgcolor="#ccffcc"
| 37
| January 22
| Milwaukee Bucks
| W 132-101
| E. Johnson (29)
| M. Cage (9)
| G. Payton (9)
| Seattle Center Coliseum9,469
| 18-19

|- bgcolor="#ffcccc"
| 38
| January 25
| @ Phoenix Suns
| L 113-128
| E. Johnson (25)
| S. Kemp (13)
| N. McMillan (7)
| Arizona Veterans Memorial Coliseum14,487
| 18-20

|- bgcolor="#ccffcc"
| 39
| January 26
| Atlanta Hawks
| W 103-102
| D. McKey (23)
| D. McKey (8)
| N. McMillan,G. Payton (9)
| Seattle Center Coliseum12,792
| 19-20

|- bgcolor="#ffcccc"
| 40
| January 28
| @ San Antonio Spurs
| L 107-119
| E. Johnson (21)
| D. McKey (14)
| G. Payton (11)
| HemisFair Arena15,908
| 19-21

|- bgcolor="#ffcccc"
| 41
| January 29
| @ Dallas Mavericks
| L 112-117
| D. McKey (24)
| O. Polynice (6)
| N. McMillan (8)
| Reunion Arena15,820
| 19-22

|- bgcolor="#ccffcc"
| 42
| January 31
| @ Houston Rockets
| W 97-94
| S. Threatt (18)
| S. Kemp (17)
| D. McKey,D. McKey (6)
| The Summit14,659
| 20-22

|- bgcolor="#ffcccc"
| 43
| February 2
| @ Indiana Pacers
| L 100-106
| G. Payton (19)
| D. McKey (7)
| G. Payton (5)
| Market Square Arena13,064
| 20–23
|- bgcolor="#ccffcc"
| 44
| February 4
| @ Charlotte Hornets
| W 100-93
| E. Johnson (34)
| M. Cage (18)
| G. Payton (9)
| Charlotte Coliseum23,901
| 21–23
|- bgcolor="#ccffcc"
| 45
| February 6
| Los Angeles Clippers
| W 107-104
| E. Johnson (27)
| S. Kemp (7)
| G. Payton (9)
| Seattle Center Coliseum12,021
| 22–23
|- bgcolor="#ffcccc"
| 46
| February 12
| Boston Celtics
| L 111-114
| E. Johnson (29)
| M. Cage (10)
| G. Payton (13)
| Seattle Center Coliseum14,594
| 22–24
|- bgcolor="#ccffcc"
| 47
| February 14
| @ Orlando Magic
| W 102-90
| D. McKey (21)
| D. McKey,O. Polynice (9)
| N. McMillan (7)
| Orlando Arena15,077
| 23–24
|- bgcolor="#ffcccc"
| 48
| February 16
| @ Atlanta Hawks
| L 113-122
| D. McKey (30)
| O. Polynice (9)
| S. Threatt (9)
| Omni Coliseum15,924
| 23–25
|- bgcolor="#ffcccc"
| 49
| February 18
| @ Detroit Pistons
| L 83-85
| E. Johnson (20)
| S. Kemp (13)
| N. McMillan (7)
| The Palace of Auburn Hills21,454
| 23–26
|- bgcolor="#ffcccc"
| 50
| February 19
| @ Philadelphia 76ers
| L 104-107 (OT)
| R. Pierce (18)
| S. Kemp (12)
| G. Payton (7)
| The Spectrum15,248
| 23–27
|- bgcolor="#ccffcc"
| 51
| February 21
| @ New York Knicks
| W 120-101
| R. Pierce (26)
| S. Kemp (13)
| N. McMillan,G. Payton,S. Threatt (5)
| Madison Square Garden12,515
| 24–27
|- bgcolor="#ffcccc"
| 52
| February 23
| Phoenix Suns
| L 110-120
| S. Kemp (25)
| S. Kemp (11)
| G. Payton (11)
| Seattle Center Coliseum14,692
| 24–28
|- bgcolor="#ccffcc"
| 53
| February 24
| Utah Jazz
| W 103-91
| S. Threatt (30)
| M. Cage (14)
| G. Payton (16)
| Seattle Center Coliseum12,080
| 25–28
|- bgcolor="#ccffcc"
| 54
| February 26
| Los Angeles Clippers
| W 93-81
| S. Threatt (31)
| S. Kemp (15)
| N. McMillan (9)
| Seattle Center Coliseum11,305
| 26–28

|- bgcolor="#ccffcc"
| 55
| March  1
| Charlotte Hornets
| W 122-105
| R. Pierce (25)
| B. Benjamin (13)
| N. McMillan (9)
| Seattle Center Coliseum13,320
| 27-28
|- bgcolor="#ccffcc"
| 56
| March  2
| Sacramento Kings
| W 120-106
| E. Johnson (31)
| B. Benjamin (16)
| N. McMillan,G. Payton (8)
| Seattle Center Coliseum12,182
| 28-28
|- bgcolor="#ccffcc"
| 57
| March  4
| @ Golden State Warriors
| W 105-99
| S. Threatt (24)
| B. Benjamin (11)
| G. Payton (10)
| Oakland–Alameda County Coliseum Arena15,025
| 29-28
|- bgcolor="#ffcccc"
| 58
| March  5
| Cleveland Cavaliers
| L 111-113 (OT)
| E. Johnson (28)
| B. Benjamin,S. Kemp (13)
| N. McMillan,G. Payton (7)
| Seattle Center Coliseum10,623
| 29-29
|- bgcolor="#ccffcc"
| 59
| March  7
| @ Minnesota Timberwolves
| W 91-86
| R. Pierce (25)
| N. McMillan (11)
| N. McMillan (8)
| Target Center19,006
| 30-29
|- bgcolor="#ffcccc"
| 60
| March  9
| @ San Antonio Spurs
| L 99-112
| E. Johnson (19)
| E. Johnson (7)
| D. Barros (5)
| HemisFair Arena15,908
| 30-30
|- bgcolor="#ffcccc"
| 61
| March  12
| @ Houston Rockets
| L 91-93
| S. Kemp (23)
| S. Kemp (16)
| D. McKey (6)
| The Summit15,508
| 30-31
|- bgcolor="#ffcccc"
| 62
| March  13
| @ Dallas Mavericks
| L 96-98
| S. Kemp (24)
| S. Kemp (13)
| S. Threatt (9)
| Reunion Arena15,813
| 30-32
|- bgcolor="#ffcccc"
| 63
| March  15
| Minnesota Timberwolves
| L 96-100 (OT)
| D. McKey (20)
| B. Benjamin (10)
| G. Payton (4)
| Seattle Center Coliseum11,497
| 30-33
|- bgcolor="#ffcccc"
| 64
| March  16
| Utah Jazz
| L 98-104 (OT)
| E. Johnson (19)
| D. McKey (9)
| G. Payton (5)
| Seattle Center Coliseum15,535
| 30-34
|- bgcolor="#ccffcc"
| 65
| March  20
| Los Angeles Lakers
| W 114-106
| B. Benjamin (28)
| D. McKey (10)
| G. Payton (12)
| Seattle Center Coliseum14,392
| 31-34
|- bgcolor="#ccffcc"
| 66
| March  22
| @ Phoenix Suns
| W 111-105
| E. Johnson (34)
| B. Benjamin (14)
| N. McMillan,G. Payton (8)
| Arizona Veterans Memorial Coliseum14,487
| 32-34
|- bgcolor="#ffcccc"
| 67
| March  24
| @ Los Angeles Lakers
| L 96-113
| S. Kemp (21)
| B. Benjamin,M. Cage (7)
| S. Threatt (7)
| Great Western Forum17,505
| 32-35
|- bgcolor="#ffcccc"
| 68
| March  26
| @ Portland Trail Blazers
| L 113-126
| R. Pierce (21)
| M. Cage (8)
| R. Pierce,S. Threatt (4)
| Memorial Coliseum12,884
| 32-36
|- bgcolor="#ffcccc"
| 69
| March  27
| Portland Trail Blazers
| L 107-112
| R. Pierce (24)
| S. Kemp (10)
| G. Payton (6)
| Tacoma Dome18,167
| 32-37
|- bgcolor="#ccffcc"
| 70
| March  29
| Minnesota Timberwolves
| W 117-107
| E. Johnson,R. Pierce (24)
| N. McMillan (7)
| G. Payton (7)
| Seattle Center Coliseum12,968
| 33-37
|- bgcolor="#ccffcc"
| 71
| March  30
| Dallas Mavericks
| W 115-102
| S. Kemp (23)
| B. Benjamin (7)
| S. Kemp,S. Threatt (4)
| Seattle Center Coliseum11,756
| 34-37

|- bgcolor="#ccffcc"
| 72
| April 3
| Sacramento Kings
| W 106-91
| E. Johnson,S. Kemp (20)
| S. Kemp (14)
| N. McMillan,S. Threatt (6)
| Seattle Center Coliseum11,987
| 35-37

|- bgcolor="#ffcccc"
| 73
| April 5
| @ Los Angeles Clippers
| L 90-109
| E. Johnson (19)
| S. Kemp (12)
| N. McMillan (4)
| Los Angeles Memorial Sports Arena12,932
| 35-38

|- bgcolor="#ccffcc"
| 74
| April 7
| W 124-117
| @ Denver Nuggets
| E. Johnson (31)
| S. Kemp (10)
| D. McKey (4)
| McNichols Sports Arena13,779
| 36-38

|- bgcolor="#ccffcc"
| 75
| April 8
| Denver Nuggets
| W 118-112
| B. Benjamin,E. Johnson,R. Pierce (19)
| B. Benjamin,S. Kemp (10)
| N. McMillan,G. Payton (8)
| Seattle Center Coliseum12,811
| 37-38

|- bgcolor="#ccffcc"
| 76
| April 10
| Los Angeles Clippers
| W 140-108
| B. Benjamin (22)
| B. Benjamin (11)
| S. Threatt (9)
| Tacoma Dome5,714
| 38-38

|- bgcolor="#ccffcc"
| 77
| April 12
| San Antonio Spurs
| W 100-99
| R. Pierce (21)
| B. Benjamin,S. Kemp (8)
| G. Payton (7)
| Seattle Center Coliseum13,340
| 39-38

|- bgcolor="#ccffcc"
| 78
| April 13
| Orlando Magic
| W 105-96
| S. Kemp (21)
| S. Kemp (7)
| D. Barros (7)
| Seattle Center Coliseum13,073
| 40-38

|- bgcolor="#ffcccc"
| 79
| April 15
| Houston Rockets
| L 93-97
| E. Johnson (22)
| M. Cage (8)
| S. Threatt (7)
| Seattle Center Coliseum13,760
| 40-39

|- bgcolor="#ffcccc"
| 80
| April 18
| @ Utah Jazz
| L 103-130
| E. Johnson (17)
| B. Benjamin (8)
| S. Threatt (6)
| Salt Palace12,616
| 40-40

|- bgcolor="#ccffcc"
| 81
| April 19
| Phoenix Suns
| W 104-93
| R. Pierce (23)
| B. Benjamin (10)
| N. McMillan (7)
| Seattle Center Coliseum12,591
| 41-40

|- bgcolor="#ffcccc"
| 82
| April 21
| @ Los Angeles Lakers
| L 100-103
| E. Johnson (18)
| B. Benjamin (12)
| N. McMillan (8)
| Great Western Forum17,505
| 41-41

Playoffs

|- align="center" bgcolor="#ffcccc"
| 1
| April 26
| @ Portland
| L 102–110
| Eddie Johnson (33)
| Benoit Benjamin (9)
| Gary Payton (8)
| Memorial Coliseum12,884
| 0–1
|- align="center" bgcolor="#ffcccc"
| 2
| April 28
| @ Portland
| L 106–115
| Eddie Johnson (28)
| Cage, Kemp (11)
| McMillan, Payton (6)
| Memorial Coliseum12,884
| 0–2
|- align="center" bgcolor="#ccffcc"
| 3
| April 30
| Portland
| W 102–99
| Sedale Threatt (29)
| Shawn Kemp (9)
| Nate McMillan (6)
| Seattle Center Coliseum14,476
| 1–2
|- align="center" bgcolor="#ccffcc"
| 4
| May 2
| Portland
| W 101–89
| Eddie Johnson (34)
| Benjamin, McKey (9)
| Gary Payton (7)
| Seattle Center Coliseum13,367
| 2–2
|- align="center" bgcolor="#ffcccc"
| 5
| May 4
| @ Portland
| L 107–119
| Johnson, Kemp (17)
| Benoit Benjamin (6)
| Gary Payton (7)
| Memorial Coliseum12,884
| 2–3

Player statistics

Season

*Statistics with the Seattle SuperSonics.

Playoffs

Awards and records

Awards
 Gary Payton was named to the NBA All-Rookie Second Team.

Records
 Ricky Pierce finished the season with a franchise record .925 in free throw percentage.

Transactions

Overview

Trades

Free agents

Additions

Subtractions

Player Transactions Citation:

References

External links
 1990–91 Seattle SuperSonics season at Basketball Reference

See also
 1990–91 NBA season

Seattle SuperSonics seasons